Anthophyllum may refer to synonyms of two different genera:
 Caryophyllia, a genus of corals
 Ficinia, a genus of sedges